Mateusz Zaremba (born 27 October 1984, in Nowogard) is a Polish handballer who plays for Pogoń Szczecin and the Polish national team.

References

External links
 Player profile on Polish Handball Association  website
 Profile at Vive Targi Kielce official website

1984 births
Living people
Polish male handball players
People from Goleniów County
Sportspeople from West Pomeranian Voivodeship
Vive Kielce players